KOOV may refer to:

 KOOV (FM), a radio station (106.9 FM) licensed to serve Kempner, Texas, United States
 KSSM, a radio station (103.1 FM) licensed to serve Copperas Cove, Texas, which held the call sign KOOV from 1977 to 2000
 Katrin Koov